Klochnevo is a rural locality (a selo) in Pribaykalsky District, Republic of Buryatia, Russia. The population was 12 as of 2010.

References 

Rural localities in Okinsky District